The 1991 Associate Members' Cup Final, known as the Leyland DAF Cup for sponsorship reasons, was the 8th final of the domestic football cup competition for teams from the Third Division and Fourth Division. The final was played at Wembley Stadium, London on 26 May 1991, and was contested by Birmingham City and Tranmere Rovers. Birmingham won the match 3–2, with Simon Sturridge and John Gayle scoring the goals for the winning team.

Match details

External links
Official website
Highlights

Associate Members' Cup Final 1991
EFL Trophy Finals
Associate Members' Cup Final 1991
Associate Members' Cup Final 1991